The Men's 50 metre backstroke competition of the swimming events at the 2015 World Aquatics Championships was held on 8 August with the heats and the semifinals and 9 August with the final.

Records
Prior to the competition, the existing world and championship records were as follows.

Results

Heats
The heats were held at 09:54.

Swim-off
It was established that there would be a swim-off between the Brazilian Guilherme Guido and the Spanish Miguel Ortiz. However Guido chose not to swim the race, preferring to rest and focus on the 4 × 100 medley relay.

Semifinals
The semifinals were held on 8 August at 18.45.

Semifinal 1

Semifinal 2

Final
The final was held on 9 August at 16:32.

References

Men's 50 metre backstroke